This is a list of settlements in Cyprus. The English-language name is indicated first, followed by the Greek name in Greek script (if it is different from the English-language name, the Greek name is rendered in the Latin alphabet), followed by the Turkish name. Listed last is a former name or one used in antiquity. Note that even though, prior to the 1974 Turkish invasion of Cyprus, Turkish names existed for some villages/towns, due to political reasons, most of the villages/towns were given a different Turkish name. The largest cities in Cyprus are Nicosia, Limassol, Larnaca, Famagusta, Paphos, Morphou and Kyrenia.

District capitals

Minor towns and villages
Note: Some names were changed from Turkish after 1974.

List of towns and villages in Northern Cyprus

Most of the Turkish names were established in 1958, then some of them were changed after the 1974 invasion (e.g. Kourou Monastiri in Nicosia District).
Note: Names of the towns are written as Greek name, new Turkish name.

Nicosia District
 Agia, Dilekkaya
 Agia Marina, Gürpınar
 Agios Vasillios, Türkeli
 Ammadies, Süleymaniye
 Ampelikou, Bağlıköy
 Angolemi, Taşpınar
 Argaki, Akçay
 Avlona, Gayretköy
 Beykoy, Beyköy
 Elia, Doğancı
 Epichio, Cihangir
 Exo Metochi, Düzova
 Fyllia, Serhatköy
 Galini, Ömerli
 Gerolakkos, Alayköy
 Kalo Chorio, Çamlıköy
 Kalo Chorio (Kapouti), Kalkanlı
 Kalyvakia, Kalavaç
 Kanli, Kanlıköy
 Kato Kopia, Zümrütköy
 Kato Zodia, Aşağıbostancı/Aşağı Bostancı
 Kazivera, Gaziveran
 Kioneli, Gönyeli
 Kokkina, Erenköy
 Kourou Monastiri, Kuru Manastır/Çukurova
 Kyra, Mevlevi
 Kythrea, Değirmenlik
 Lefka, Lefke
 Louroukina, Akıncılar/Lurucina
 Loutros, Bademliköy
 Limnitis, Yeşilırmak
 Mandres, Hamitköy
 Masari, Şahinler
 Mia Milia, Haspolat
 Mora, Meriç
 Morfou, Güzelyurt/Omorfo
 Neo Chorio, Minareliköy
 Nikitas, Güneşköy
 Ortakoy, Ortaköy
 Palekythro, Balıkesir
 Pano Zodia, Yukarıbostancı/Yukarı Bostancı
 Pentagia, Yeşilyurt
 Peristeronari, Cengizköy
 Petra, Taşköy
 Petra tou Digeni, Yeniceköy
 Potamos tou Kampou, Yedidalga
 Prastio, Aydınköy
 Pyrogi, Gaziler
 Skylloura, Yılmazköy
 Syrianochori, Yayla
 Trachoni, Demirhan
 Tymvou, Kırklar
 Tymvou Airport, Ercan Havaalani
 Voni, Gökhan
 Xeros, Gemikonağı
 Xerovounos, Yukarıyeşilırmak

Kyrenia District
 Agia Irini, Akdeniz
 Agios Amvrosios, Esentepe
 Agios Epiktitos, Çatalköy
 Agios Ermolaos, Şirinevler
 Agios Georgios, Karaoğlanoğlu
 Agirta, Ağırdağ
 Agridaki, Alemdağ
 Asomatos, Özhan
 Belapais, Beylerbeyi/Belabayıs
 Charchia, Karaağaç
 Diorios, Tepebaşı
 Elia, Yeşiltepe
 Fota, Dağyolu
 Ftericha, Ilgaz
 Kalogrea, Bahçeli
 Kampyli, Hisarköy
 Karakoumi, Karakum
 Karmi, Karaman
 Karpasia, Karpaşa/Kırpaşa/Karpaz
 Kato Dikomo, Aşağıdikmen/Aşağı Dikmen
 Kazafani, Ozanköy/Kazafana
 Kepini, Arapköy
 Kyrenia, Girne
 Komurcu, Kömürcü
 Kontemenos, Kılıçaslan
 Kormakitis, Koruçam/Kormacit
 Koutoventis, Güngör
 Krini, Pınarbaşı
 Lapithos, Lapta
 Larnakas, Kozan
 Livera, Sadrazamköy
 Motides, Alsancak
 Myrtou, Çamlıbel
 Orga, Kayalar
 Paleosofos, Malatya
 Panagra, Geçitköy
 Pano Dikomo, Yukarıdikmen/Yukarı Dikmen
 Pentadaktylos, Beşparmaklar/Beşparmak Dağları
 Pileri, Göçeri
 Sikhari, Aşağıtaşkent/Aşağı Taşkent
 Sysklipos, Akçiçek
 Templos, Zeytinlik
 Thermia, Doğanköy
 Trapeza, Beşparmak
 Trimithi, Edremit
 Vasilia, Karşıyaka
 Vouno, Yukarıtaşkent/Yukarı Taşkent

Famagusta District
 Acheritou, Güvercinlik
 Achna, Düzce/Ahna
 Afania, Gaziköy
 Agia Trias, Sipahi
 Agios Andronios, Topçuköy
 Agios Andronikos, Yeşilköy
 Agios Chartion, Ergenekon
 Agios Efstathios, Zeybekköy
 Agios Georgios, Aygün
 Agios Iakovo, Altınova
 Agios Ilias, Yarköy
 Agios Nikolaos, Yamaçköy
 Agios Sergios, Yeniboğaziçi/Yeni Boğaziçi
 Agios Symeon, Avtepe
 Agios Theodoros, Çayırova
 Akanthou, Tatlısu
 Aloa, Atlılar
 Ammochostos, Mağusa/Gazimağusa
 Angastina, Aslanköy
 Ardana, Ardahan
 Arnadi, Kuzucuk
 Artemi, Arıdamı
 Assia, Paşaköy
 Avgolida, Kurtuluş
 Bogazi, Boğaz
 Davlos, Kaplıca
 Egkomi, Tuzla
 Eptakomi, Yedikonuk
 Flamoudi, Mersinlik
 Gaidouras, Korkuteli
 Galatia, Mehmetçik
 Galinoporni, Kaleburnu
 Gastria, Kelecik
 Genagra, Nergizli
 Gerani, Turnalar
 Gialousa, Yenierenköy/Yeni Erenköy
 Goufes, Çamlıca
 Gypsou, Akova
 Kalopsida, Çayönü
 Kiados, Serdarlı
 Kilanemos, Esenköy
 Knodara, Gönendere
 Koma tou Gialou, Kumyalı
 Komi Kepir, Büyükkonuk
 Kontea, Türkmenköy
 Kornokipos, Görneç
 Korovia, Kuruova
 Kouklia, Köprülü
 Kridia, Kilitkaya
 Lapathos, Sınırüstü
 Lefkoniko, Geçitkale
 Leonarisso, Ziyamet
 Limnia, Mormenekşe
 Livadia, Sazlıköy
 Lysi, Akdoğan
 Lythragkomi, Boltaşlı
 Makrasyka, İncirli
 Mandres, Ağıllar
 Maratha, Muratağa
 Marathovounos, Ulukışla
 Melanarka, Adaçay
 Melounta, Mallıdağ
 Millia, Yıldırım
 Monagra, Boğaztepe
 Mousoulita, Kurudere
 Neta, Taşlıca
 Ovgoros, Ergazi
 Patriki, Tuzluca
 Pergamos, Beyarmudu
 Peristerona, Alaniçi
 Perivolia tou Trikomou, Bahçeler/Bahçalar
 Platani, Çınarlı
 Platanissos, Balalan
 Prastio, Dörtyol
 Psyllatos, Sütlüce
 Pyrga, Pirhan
 Rizokarpaso, Dipkarpaz
 Santalaris, Sandallar/Şehitler
 Sinta, İnönü/Sinde
 Spathariko, Ötüken
 Strongylos, Turunçlu
 Stylli, Mutluyaka
 Tavros, Pamuklu
 Trikomo, İskele
 Trypimeni, Tirmen
 Vasili, Gelincik
 Vatili, Vadili
 Vathylakas, Derince
 Vitsada, Pınarlı
 Vokolida, Bafra

See also
 Lists of cities
 Districts of Cyprus

References

External links

 List of city names pre- and post-1974 (set the code map in your browser to Greek)

 
Cities, towns and villages in Cyprus
Cyprus, List of cities in
Cyprus